This is a list of the gymnasts who represented their country at the 1936 Summer Olympics in Berlin from 1 to 16 August 1936. Only one discipline, artistic gymnastics, was included in the Games.

Female artistic gymnasts

Male artistic gymnasts

References 

Lists of gymnasts
Gymnastics at the 1936 Summer Olympics